Echinodorus trialatus is a type of plant. In Rataj's taxonomy, E. trialatus is in Section Paniculati, Subgenus Echinodorus.

Description

Leaves with blades about as long as the winged petioles and tapering into them, long tapered at the tip, with the upper pair of veins parallel to the midrib and leaving it at some distance from the base, 30 – 45 cm long. Blades longly oval, on both ends regularly narrowed, or lanceolate with 3 - 5 veins, without pellucid markings, 17 – 25 cm long x 2.5 – 5 cm wide.

Stem erect, along the whole length distinctly alate (3 - winged), 30 – 70 cm long. Inflorescence usually racemose, rarely branched in the lower whorl, having 6 - 13 whorls. Bracts longer than the pedicels with flowers, 1.5 – 2 cm long having 19 - 21 distinct ribs. Flowers sessile or subsessile on pedicels 2 – 4 mm long. Sepals about 5 mm long, with usually 18 ribs, corolla white. Aggregate fruit globular, 5 – 7 mm in diameter. Stamens usually 18, anthers 1.5 mm long, as long as the filaments. Achenes 2.5 – 3 mm long x 1 - 1.2mm wide, distinctly ribbed only in the lower part of the body, the upper third without ribs, lateral glands absent.

Distribution

Panama, Colombia & Venezuela normally growing submersed.

External links
 Echinodorus site - German text but useful photograph

trialatus